Tusheh Mian (also Romanized as Tūsheh Mīān; also known as Tūshmīyān) is a village in Amlash-e Jonubi Rural District, in the Central District of Amlash County, Gilan Province, Iran. At the 2006 census, its population was 118, in 30 families.

References 

Populated places in Amlash County